Joanna E. McClinton (born August 19, 1982) is an American politician from Pennsylvania currently serving as the 143rd Speaker of the Pennsylvania House of Representatives since February 28, 2023. A member of the Democratic Party she is the first woman to serve as Speaker, she previously served as Majority Leader from February 8th to February 28th and Minority Leader from December 2020 to February 2023.She has served as the representative from the 191st district representing Delaware County and Philadelphia, Pennsylvania since 2015.

Education and early career 
McClinton received her Bachelor's of Arts in Political Science from La Salle University. She earned her J.D. from Villanova University. During her enrollment at Villanova School of Law, McClinton interned at the Philadelphia District Attorney's Office as well as the Defender Association of Philadelphia. Upon graduation, McClinton went on to work for seven years as an assistant public defender. She was eventually named assistant chief of the East Zone. In 2013, McClinton was named Chief Counsel to State Senator Anthony Hardy Williams of the 8th district.

McClinton's volunteer work includes acting as a board member of La Salle University's Alumni Association board of directors and president of La Salle University's African American Alumni Association, acting as a youth minister for ten years, volunteering at the Outreach to Youth and Hand of Compassion American Sign Language Ministry, and serving as secretary to Philadelphia Barrister's Association.

Political career
McClinton started her first term in the state legislature after she won a special election for Pennsylvania House of Representatives in 2015, winning 70% of the vote and beating Republican Charles Wilkins. The special election was held following Ronald Waters' resignation on June 1, 2015 after he pled guilty to cash payments from lobbyists and sentenced to 23 months probation. She then went on to win reelection in 2016, and was named secretary/treasurer of the Philadelphia County Delegation alongside Maria Donatucci and Jason Dawkins.

McClinton's policy proposals center around education reform, job creation, creating a state-funded indigent defense system, and reforming the criminal justice system. She proposed legislation to establish universal pre-K and reform the Pennsylvania's expungement system. As a public defender, much of McClinton's focus has been on reforming Pennsylvania's criminal justice system. She has proposed changing the indigent defense system from being funded by the city to being funded by the state, and connecting constituents with career placement resources. During the 2017–2018 legislative session McClinton will propose legislation that she co-sponsored to create a school-based drug substance abuse intervention program in Pennsylvania schools. This proposed legislation would require the Board of Education to work alongside the Pennsylvania Department of Drug and Alcohol Program to develop the appropriate curriculum guidelines and would require schools to implement the program into their health classes.

In 2018, she was elected to serve as Democratic Caucus Chair by members of the House Democratic Caucus.

In November 2020, she was elected to serve as the House Democratic Leader. She became Majority Leader in 2023.

On , McClinton was elected Speaker of the Pennsylvania House of Representatives, becoming the first woman and second Black person (after K. Leroy Irvis) to hold the post.

References

External links
PA House profile
Official Party website

|-

|-

1982 births
20th-century African-American women
21st-century African-American politicians
21st-century African-American women
21st-century American women politicians
African-American state legislators in Pennsylvania
African-American women in politics
Democratic Party members of the Pennsylvania House of Representatives
Floor leaders of state legislatures in the United States
La Salle University alumni
Living people
Public defenders
Speakers of the Pennsylvania House of Representatives
Villanova University School of Law alumni
Women state legislators in Pennsylvania